is a village located in Kunigami District, Okinawa Prefecture, Japan.

As of 2016, the village has an estimated population of 1,683 and a population density of 21 persons per km². The total area is 81.79 km².

Ecotourism 
The village of Higashi is one of the most remote places on Okinawa island and has become a hotspot of ecotourism. Okinawa's first ecotourism association was established in Higashi in 1998, with various associations eventually combined in 2005 to become the Higashi Village Tourism Promotion Association. One major project was the building of a ten-hectare mangrove forest called Hirugi Park, built around Gesashi Bay, the largest such forest on the island. The mangroves had been designated as a natural Monument of Japan in 1972 and were eventually incorporated into Yambaru National Park in 2016.

Education
Schools are: Higashi Combined Kindergarten, Elementary, and Junior High School (東幼小中学校), Arume Kindergarten and Elementary School (有銘幼小学校), and Takae Elementary School (高江小学校).

Notable residents 
 Ai Miyazato, golfer
 Yūsaku Miyazato, golfer

See also
 Yambaru

References

External links 

 Higashi official website 

Villages in Okinawa Prefecture